Maroonah Station, often referred to as Maroonah, is a pastoral lease that operates as a sheep station.

The traditional owners of the area are the Tharrkari, who currently lease and manage neighbouring Ullawarra station.

Maroonah was established in 1893 by J. H. Mansfield and began trading in wool the same year. Mansfield had previously managed Karratha and Middalya Stations before acquiring Maroonah. Following the death of Mansfield in 1907 the property was being run his wife, Annie Mansfield, and the manager of the property John Griffin.

The station was flooded in 1909 following severe weather that washed away miles of fencing. Later the same year shearing produced a clip of over 150 bales of wool from the flock of 10,000 sheep. Annie Mansfield died in 1911 and the partnership of Mansfield and Griffin was dissolved in 1912, with Maroonah being put up for auction later the same year.

It was watered by nine wells and stocked with 10,200 sheep and 70 horses. The purchaser was W. S. Finey, who hired G. F. Egan to be the station's manager. When Finey arrived he found the property in the grip of a drought and plagued by dingos. The stock was mustered and it was found that only 2,000 sheep were present.

Frank Craig, the owner of Portree and Yalbalgo Stations, acquired Maroonah in October 1913. The Craig family remained associated with the property, with Gordon Craig dying in 1951.

The land use agreement allows the Thudgari access to their traditional lands to hunt, gather and camp.

The properties were listed at 7 million.

See also
List of ranches and stations

References

Pastoral leases in Western Australia
Stations (Australian agriculture)
Pilbara
1893 establishments in Australia